Las Pequeñas Cosas (English: The Little Things) may refer to:

"Las Pequeñas Cosas", a song by Amanda Miguel, 1984, later covered by Las Chicas del Can and Gloria Trevi
"Las Pequeñas Cosas", a song by Jotdog from their eponymous album, 2009

See also
"Las Cosas Pequeñas", a song by Prince Royce, 2012